Gabriele Gebauer (born 10 April 1958) is an Austrian handball player who played for the Austrian national team. She represented Austria at the 1984 Summer Olympics in Los Angeles.

References

1958 births
Living people
Austrian female handball players
Olympic handball players of Austria
Handball players at the 1984 Summer Olympics